The following are the national records in athletics in Saudi Arabia maintained by the Saudi Arabian Athletics Federation (SAAF).

Outdoor

Key to tables:

+ = en route to a longer distance

h = hand timing

A = affected by altitude

dh = downhill course

X = annulled due to doping violation

Men

Women

Indoor

Men

Women

References
General
World Athletics Statistic Handbook 2022: National Outdoor Records
World Athletics Statistic Handbook 2022: National Indoor Records
Specific

External links
 SAAF web site

Saudi Arabia
Athletics
Records
Athletics